The Canadian province of New Brunswick has 15 counties. While they no longer serve as a local government territorial division as traditionally defined with shire towns or county towns, they continue to define a regional community.

With the reorganization of local government legislation contained in the Robichaud government's reforms, collectively called the New Brunswick Equal Opportunity program, county municipalities ceased to function in 1966 and their councils were dissolved.

Another form of regional local government did not replace the county. Instead, many small village municipalities were created, with the surrounding predominantly rural areas remaining unincorporated. Of these unincorporated areas, 92 of them in 11 counties were made into units for provincial administration, based largely on the former civil parishes.

Counties continue to be used as an organizational unit, along with their parishes, for registration of real estate among other things. They figure prominently in residents' sense of place and continue as significant threads in the Province's cultural fabric (i.e., most citizens always know which county they are in), and they still appear on some maps.

List

See also
 Administrative divisions of New Brunswick
 List of municipalities in New Brunswick
 List of parishes in New Brunswick
 Local government in Canada
 Local service district (New Brunswick)
 Provinces and territories of Canada

References

External links
 New Brunswick Parishes
 New Brunswick Communities Past and Present: County Listing

 
Local government in New Brunswick
Counties
New Brunswick